Sanjarabad may refer to:
 Sanjarabad, North Khorasan
 Sanjarabad, Razavi Khorasan